Galen Russell Head (April 16, 1947 – March 14, 2020) was a Canadian professional ice hockey player who spent the majority of his career, which lasted from 1967 to 1976, with the Johnstown Jets of the Eastern Hockey League and North American Hockey League. Head played one game in the NHL with the Detroit Red Wings during the 1967-68 NHL season and wore #15.

Juniors
Head started out playing in the Grande Prairie Minor Hockey Association at age 13. Three years later, Head would move to senior hockey and play in the South Peace Hockey League as a member of the Grande Prairie Athletics, where he would win SPHL Rookie Of The Year honors in 1963–64.

He remained with the Athletics until midway through the 1964–65 season, where he received an invite from the Edmonton Oil Kings. Head remained with the Oil Kings during the 1965–66 season, where he faced off against the Oshawa Generals, a team led by future Hockey Hall Of Fame member Bobby Orr. The Oil Kings would go on to defeat the Generals and would win the Memorial Cup. Head would score 16 points in 19 games during the 1965–66 post-season.

Head continued to play with the Oil Kings for one more season, scoring 50 goals and 42 assists and trailing Garnet "Ace" Bailey in regular season point totals.

Professional
Head received an invitation from the National Hockey League's Detroit Red Wings to attend training camp in the fall of 1967. In camp, he was assigned #15 and was given $130 for a one-game tryout but was released on September 22.

Head was later assigned to the Johnstown Jets, a team in the Eastern Hockey League. He would score 53 goals in his rookie season. As a result, Head was recalled by Detroit where he would "play six or seven shifts" in his only game with the Red Wings, on March 21, 1968, against the Toronto Maple Leafs. Head would also see time with the Fort Worth Wings, another Detroit affiliate.

The following season, Head had his best statistical season. He would score 67 goals and 121 points in 72 games, which led all EHL players.

Head later became player/coach of the Jets during the 1973–74 season as a result of a coach walking out prior to the start of the season. Head was later named official head coach that season and be named captain of the team. He would play until the 1975–76 season, where he would retire after eight seasons with the Jets.

Head ranks among the leader in many career statistics in Johnstown history. His 308 goals as a member of the Jets ranks third all time, while his 601 points rank fourth and his 293 assists are sixth highest. His 67 goal season and 69 single season goals (regular and post-season) were a record until former Johnstown Chiefs forward Mark Green eclipsed the totals with 68 goals in the regular season and 70 single season goals in 1991–92.

Awards
 CMJHL Second All-Star Team – 1967

Personal
Head, like several members of the 1975–76 Johnstown Jets, had a part in the movie Slap Shot. He played one of the uncredited hockey players. His wife, Grace Head, had a credited speaking part as "Pam", one of the hockey wives in the movie.

Head was one of several people responsible for founding the Bishop McCort hockey program in 1985. With Head leading the team as head coach, McCort would go to win three Pennsylvania state championships over a period of eleven years.

On October 18, 2003, Head was the third person to have their number retired by the Johnstown Chiefs. Although he did not play for the Chiefs, as they were founded after his retirement, he was recognized for his contributions as a player with the Jets, his tenure with the Chiefs providing game night scouting reports, and for his contributions to hockey to the city of Johnstown. He is also a member of the Cambria County Sports Hall of Fame, the Johnstown Hockey Hall Of Fame, and the Grande Prairie Hockey Hall of Fame.

Head died in Johnstown, Pennsylvania on March 14, 2020.

Career statistics

Regular season and playoffs

See also
 List of players who played only one game in the NHL

References

External links
 

1947 births
2020 deaths
Canadian ice hockey right wingers
Detroit Red Wings players
Edmonton Oil Kings (WCHL) players
Fort Worth Wings players
Ice hockey people from Alberta
Johnstown Jets players
North American Hockey League (1973–1977) coaches
People from Grande Prairie
Salt Lake Golden Eagles (WHL) players
Undrafted National Hockey League players